The 2009 Russian Artistic Gymnastics Championships was held in Bryansk, Bryansk Oblast, Russia between 6–14 March 2009.

Medalists

References

External links
  Official site

2009 in gymnastics
Artistic Gymnastics Championships
Russian Artistic Gymnastics Championships
March 2009 sports events in Russia